Biscuit is a small baked product; the exact meaning varies markedly in different parts of the world.

Biscuit, The Biscuit, or Biscuits may also refer to:

Food
Biscuit (bread) (in North America), a small round of leavened quick bread that is tender, moist, and thick
Beaten biscuit, a hard variety of North America biscuit, similar to hardtack
Biscotti, Italian biscuits
Bisquick a baking mix originally intended to use for making biscuits quickly
Cookie, a small, round, crisp, dry, and flat piece of flour confectionery known as a biscuit in many countries
Cracker (food), a crisp, dry, thin, and savory flour wafer
Dog biscuit, a hard, dry cracker that is a type of dog food
Hardtack, a simple dough made from flour, water, and salt
Sponge cake, some varieties known as biscuits

People
Chuck Biscuits, a drummer
Marques Hagans, an American football player nicknamed "Biscuit"
Cornelius Bennett, an American football player nicknamed "Biscuit"

Arts, entertainment, and media

Fictional characters
Biscuit, a fictional dog who is a character from the I Can Read! series of children's books
John Cage (character), a fictional character on the TV show Ally McBeal, nicknamed "The Biscuit"
Biscuit Krueger, a character from the manga series Hunter × Hunter

Music
 Biscuit or vinyl biscuit, a vinyl material before it is pressed into a gramophone record
Biscuits (EP), a 1991 EP by funk metal band Living Colour
"Biscuit" (song), a 2015 song by Ivy Levan 
"Biscuit," a song by Portishead from their 1994 album Dummy
"Biscuits" (song), a 2015 song by American country singer Kacey Musgraves 
"Biscuits," a song by Ghostface Killah from his album The Pretty Toney Album

Other arts, entertainment, and media
Biscuit (game), a drinking game originating in France using a pair of standard dice

Other uses
 Biscuit (pottery) (or "bisque"), partly-made pottery that has been fired but not yet glazed
 Biscuit porcelain, unglazed porcelain as a finished product 
 Behavioral Science Consultation Teams (BSCT, pronounced "biscuit"), groups of psychiatrists, other medical doctors, and psychologists who study detainees in American extrajudicial detention
 Biscuit Fire, a 2002 wildfire that took place in the Siskiyou National Forest
 Biscuit joiner, a woodworking tool used to join two pieces of wood together
 Biscuit, an inflatable tube used in the sport of biscuiting
 The Biscuit, a card carried at all times by the current U.S. President containing the Gold Codes
 Biscuits, a nickname for methadone
 Hockey puck, as in "He puts the biscuit in the basket!"
 Montgomery Biscuits, a minor league baseball team
 National Biscuit Company, or Nabisco for short

See also
 Making biscuits, a behavior seen in cats where they knead 
 Seabiscuit (disambiguation)
 
 Biskit, an open source software package written in Python code
 Biskits, a restaurant chain in Florida that was bought out by Bojangles' Famous Chicken 'n Biscuits
 The Biskitts, a Hanna-Barbera cartoon featuring anthropomorphic dogs